The Tunisian Sahel or more precisely the Central East Tunisia Region is an area of central eastern Tunisia and one of the six Tunisian regions. It stretches along the eastern shore, from Hammamet in the north to Mahdia in the south, including the governorates of Monastir, Mahdia and Sousse. Its name derives from the Arabic word sāḥil (ساحل), meaning "shore" or "coast".
The region's economy is based especially on tourism and it contains the second-biggest airport in Tunisia: Monastir Habib Bourguiba International Airport.

Geography 

The Sahel extends inland to the hills which protect the low plains of the coast and are covered in olive plantations; the region's low rainfall is compensated for by the atmospheric humidity.

Since antiquity, it has formed a clear geographic unity with its own unique demographic and economic characteristics. Today it consists of the governorates of Sousse, Monastir and Mahdia.

Its geographic area is quite large: about 140 km from north to south and varying between twenty and sixty kilometres east to west.

History 
Long inhabited, the area of the modern Tunisian Sahel seems to have been a distinct region dominated by urban settlements on the sea since antiquity; this tradition predates the region's conversion to Islam and Arabisation, but its continuity with region's Arab history is clear.

Phoenician settlement 
Most of the cities of the Sahel were founded by the Phoenicians. Thus Hadrumetum was founded at the beginning of the 9th century BC by Tyre - even before Carthage. It gained importance in the following centuries, becoming one of the main Phoenician ports in the Western Mediterranean. The area was a key part of the Carthaginian empire, but after the Second Punic War it came under increasing Numidian influence. In 146 BC, after the Third Punic War, it became part of the new Roman province of Africa.

Rome and Byzantium 
The Sahel was the location of one of the key battles of the War between Pompey and Caesar. Julius Caesar landed at Ruspina on 28 December 47 BC, marched to Thapsus and put it under siege at the end of February 46 BC. The Battle of Thapsus took place on 6 April and was a massive victory for Caesar and the city surrendered to him shortly after. Then he proceeded to take control of northern Tunisia.

Around 293 AD the Romans divided the province of Africa and the Sahel became its own province, named Byzacena, which was among the provinces ceded to the Vandals in 442. It was recaptured by the Eastern Roman Empire in the Vandalic War and then formed one of the seven provinces of the Exarchate of Africa, which stretched west to the Atlantic.

Caliphates 

With the arrival of Islam and the establishment of the capital of Ifriqiya, Kairouan, in the region, the Sahel's maritime ports became the key to its security. This explains the construction of several ribats in the region, which served defensive, religious and Maraboutic purposes. The most important ribats are those of Monastir, built by governor Harthama ibn A'yun in 796, and of Sousse, built by the Aghlabid emirs.

African Emirates 
The city of Sousse received a shipyard which played an important role in the conquest of Sicily, which was launched from it.

The foundation of Mahdia by the Fatamids in 916 gave the Sahel a key political role which continued under the Zirids. Kairouan lost some of its religious role to Monastir, where figures including the Zirid princes and Imam Mezri were buried. Mahdia became the seat of a splendid court which drew poets from across the Maghreb, Al-Andalus and Sicily. However, the invasion of Banu Hilal plunged the region into chaos and Tunisia fractured into numerous taifas; only the Sahel remained under Zirid control. Even Sousse broke away from their power, adopting a republican government. The invasion led to the further urbanisation of the region, with the establishment of many villages which still exist today. A little later the region suffered from Norman attacks – Mahdia was taken in 1148 by troops of Roger II of Sicily – until the arrival of the Almohads in 1160. After this period the Sahel experienced a decline in importance following the transfer of the capital to Tunis.

Beylik of Tunis 
In the 19th century, the Sahel was divided into two qaidates, one based at Sousse and the other at Monastir, which occupied approximately the same area as the modern Tunisian governorates of Monastir and Mahdia. They were alternatively called awtan (plural of watan, meaning "district"), individually watan Susah and watan al'Munastir. The two qaidates were awarded only to individuals close to the beys. Often both positions were controlled by a single individual, as was the case with the grand viziers Shakir al-Taba'a (1836) and Mohammed Khaznadar (1851), who was also named "Mohammed governor of the Sahel" (Mohammed 'amil as-Sahil). The majority of the cities and villages of the Sahel revolted against the Bey in 1864. After this, the general Ahmed Zarrouk imposed a heavy tribute (financed by the sail of goods and property) and confiscated large areas of olive plantation.

French protectorate 

After the establishment of a French protectorate, the new power established the qaidate of Jemmal (which took part of modern Monastir and Mahdia governorates) and centralised the region at Sousse which became the seat of civil government, contributing to the weakening of the other regional centres.

Modern Tunisia 
After independence, the government of Neo Destour ended the Sahel's administrative union during the abolition of the qaidates and establishment of the modern system of governorates. The whole region was under the control of the governor of Sousse from 1956 to 1974, when the governorates of Monastir and Mahdia were created.

Cities 

Akouda
Bekalta
Bembla
Beni Hassen
Bennane
Bouhjar
Boumerdes
Chebba
Chorbane
Chott Meriem
El Bradâa
El Jem
El Masdour
Enfida
Hammam Sousse
Hebira
Hergla
Jemmal
Kalâa Kebira
Kalâa Seghira
Kerker
Khniss
Kondar
Ksar Hellal
Ksibet El Mediouni
Ksour Essef
Lamta
Mahdia
Malloulech
Menzel Kamel
Moknine
Monastir
M'saken
Messaadine
Ouardanine
Ouled Chamekh
Rejich
Sahline Moôtmar
Salakta
Sayada
Sidi Ameur
Sidi Alouane
Sidi Bou Ali
Sidi El Hani
Souassi
Sousse
Takrouna
Téboulba
Zaouiet Kontoch
Zeramdine

Demographics 
The Sahel has long been characterised by a large population; its three governorates contain  inhabitants of 1,634,611 million peoples The region is thus the Third most populous in Tunisia after North East Tunisia region and South East Tunisia.

Economy 

The Sahel occupies a central position on the Mediterranean Sea and is one of the country's most important areas for bathing and tourism on account of the large number of beaches. The cities of Monastir and Sousse are key tourist centres and Mahdia has been attempting to develop its tourist industry since the 1990s. It is home to the Monastir Habib Bourguiba International Airport, which is the busiest airport in the country in terms of passenger numbers and has the most charter flights of any airport in Africa. There is a commercial port at Sousse, numerous fishing ports and two marinas (Port El Kantaoui and Cap Monastir).

The A1 crosses the region from north to south and there are two railways (national and regional).

Transport 
The public transport authority for bus travel within and between the cities of the Sahel is the Société de transport du Sahel (STS), which has its headquarters at Sousse and is divided into three regional branches corresponding to the three governorates. The Sahel Metro is the regional railway line, making several trips daily between Mahdia and Sousse.

The Sahel is an important part of the Tunisian autoroute network, with a major node of the A1 at M'saken, which continues north for 140 km to Tunis and south for 98 km to Sfax. A parallel route runs along the coast.

Sport 

The region's name is used by the omnisports club of Sousse, the Étoile sportive du Sahel. The club is supported throughout the region and is one of the most popular sporting clubs in the country. The football club Étoile Sportive du Sahel has achieved several continental victories. The second famous and historical omnisports team in the region is US Monastir located in Monastir since 1923 under the name of Ruspina Sports that was changed in 1942 by Union Sportive Monastirienne. The club was known as the club of the first president of Tunisia native from Monastir Habib Bourguiba who was seen present in Mustapha Ben Jannet stadium for many times. The football club plays in the first division of Tunisian league and has no national and continental title, and the basketball team has won several Tunisian titles and one continental title.

The region is also known for handball, the second most popular sport in Tunisia. The region is home to several handball clubs, of which the most important are the Étoile Sportive du Sahel H.C., El Makarem de Mahdia and SC Moknine.

Famous individuals

Politics

 Abdelwahab Abdallah
 Zine El Abidine Ben Ali
 Hedi Baccouche
 Habib Bourguiba
 Abdelaziz Ben Dhia
 Amor Rourou
 Mohamed Ghannouchi
 Idriss Guiga
 Hamadi Jebali
 Mohamed Jegham
 Hamed Karoui
 Habib Chatty
 Kamel Morjane
 Mohammed Mzali
 Hedi Nouira
 Rachid Sfar
 Bechir Tekkari

Sciences and letters
 M'hamed Hassine Fantar
 Youssef Rzouga

Sports
 Abdelmajid Chetali

References

Bibliography 

 Ridha Lamine, Villes et citadins du Sahel central, Faculté des lettres et sciences humaines de Sousse / L'Or du Temps, Sousse / Tunis, 2001
 Abdellatif Mrabet, Du Byzacium au Sahel, L'Or du Temps, Tunis, 1998
 Xavier Thyssen, Des manières d'habiter dans le Sahel tunisien, Centre national de la recherche scientifique, Paris, 1983

External links 

 Ezzeddine Houimli et Pierre Donadieu, « Le meskat. Un système hydraulique de production oléicole menacé par l'étalement urbain. Le cas de la région de Sousse Nord (Tunisie) », Actes du séminaire « Étapes de recherches en paysage », n° 7, éd. École nationale supérieure du paysage, Versailles, 2005

Geography of Tunisia